Hacıhalil is a village in the Adıyaman District, Adıyaman Province, Turkey. Its population is 241 (2021).

The hamlets of Arslanoğlu and Kıvırcık are attached to the village.

References

Villages in Adıyaman District

Kurdish settlements in Adıyaman Province